KGB is a Soviet-era themed ("Communist chic"
) bar located in the East Village of New York City at 85 E. 4th Street, New York, New York 10003.

History
Before its present incarnation, the building had been the Palm Casino, a speakeasy controlled by Lucky Luciano. From 1948 to 1988 it was a private social club for Ukrainian Socialists who met behind its double-locked doors to hide their political affiliations from the rampant McCarthyism of the era. The Ukrainian-American League, which operated the club, continued to function in the building's basement in 1998. 

Inspired by the Soviet-era memorabilia stored in the building, KGB Bar opened in 1993, and became one of the most popular book-reading venues in New York City. Popular authors read here pro bono on Sunday evenings (fiction), Monday evenings (poetry), and most Tuesdays, Wednesdays and Thursdays. KGB has been named best literary venue in New York City by New York magazine, The Village Voice, and others.

Reading series
The bar hosts several regular reading series which include:
 Trumpet Fiction – Literary fiction and arts, held on the second Saturday of every month, hosted by Jonathan Kravetz
 Fantastic Fiction – A monthly speculative fiction reading series at the KGB Bar, held on the third Wednesday of every month, currently hosted by Ellen Datlow and Matthew Kressel
 Monday Night Poetry Series – Founded by David Lehman and Star Black, this legendary series has lasted more than a decade and features an impressive slate of major contemporary poets in its fall and spring seasons. The series spawned a book, The KGB Bar Book of Poems, in 2000. Currently hosted by Matthew Yeager and John Deming.

References

External links
 
 Fantastic Fiction at KGB 
 Trumpet Fiction

East Village, Manhattan
Bars (establishments)
Speakeasies
Drinking establishments in New York City
Communist chic
Ukrainian-American culture in New York City